The Last of a Dying Breed is the sixth studio album by American rapper Scarface. The album was released on October 3, 2000, by Rap-A-Lot Records and Virgin Records. The album was less successful commercially than his last few efforts, but more successful critically. It debuted at number 7 on the Billboard 200 chart, selling 133,972 copies in its first week being certified Gold by the RIAA.

The album includes the singles "Look Me in My Eyes" and "It Ain't, Pt. 2". The song, "They Down with Us" is a remake of the Boogie Down Productions classic, "I'm Still #1".

Track listing

Chart positions

Weekly charts

Year-end charts

Certifications

References

2000 albums
Scarface (rapper) albums
Rap-A-Lot Records albums
Albums produced by Erick Sermon
Albums produced by N.O. Joe